Hell's Cargo is a 1939 British adventure film directed by Harold Huth and starring Walter Rilla, Kim Peacock and Robert Newton.

It was made at Elstree Studios. The film is a remake of the 1938 French hit Alert in the Mediterranean. Kim Peacock reprised his role as a Royal Navy Commodore from the earlier film. On its release in the United States it was retitled as Dangerous Cargo at the request of the Hays Office.

Cast
 Walter Rilla as Cmndt. Lestailleur 
 Kim Peacock as Cmdr. Falcon 
 Robert Newton as Cmdr. Tomasou 
 Penelope Dudley-Ward as Annette Lestailleur 
 Geoffrey Atkins as Pierre Lestailieur 
 Ronald Adam as Capt. Dukes 
 Charles Victor as Mr. Martin 
Martin Walker as Dr. Laurence 
 Henry Oscar as Liner captain 
 Henry Morell as Father Blanc 
 Louise Hampton as Civil Defense warden

References

Bibliography
 Low, Rachael. Filmmaking in 1930s Britain. George Allen & Unwin, 1985.
 Wood, Linda. British Films, 1927-1939. British Film Institute, 1986.

External links

1939 films
1939 adventure films
Films directed by Harold Huth
Seafaring films
Films set in the Mediterranean Sea
British remakes of French films
British black-and-white films
British adventure films
Films shot at Associated British Studios
1930s English-language films
1930s British films
English-language adventure films